This is a list of museums in Costa Rica.

Most of the wide selection of museums in Costa Rica are in the Central Valley, especially in the capital city of San José.

List of museums

San José
 Centro Costarricense de la Ciencia y la Cultura
 Museo de los Niños (The Children's Museum)
 Museo de Arte y Diseño Contemporáneo (Museum of Contemporary Art and Design)
 Museo de Formas Espacios y Sonidos (Shapes, Spaces, and Sounds Museum)
 Museo de Oro Precolombiano (The Museum of Pre-Columbian Gold)
 Museo del Jade (Museum of Jade)
 Museo Filatélico y Numismático de Costa Rica (Philatelic and Numismatic Museum)
 Museo Nacional de Costa Rica (The National Museum)
  (Museum of Italian Contemporary Art in America)
  (Costa Rican Art Museum)
 Museo de Criminología (Criminology Museum)
 Museo de Insectos de la Universidad de Costa Rica (MIUCR) (Museum of Insects at The University of Costa Rica)
  (Numismatic Museum)
 Museo de Zoología - Escuela de Biología (Zoology Museum), University of Costa Rica
 Museo del Colegio Superior de Señoritas (Women's Education and History Museum), 
 Museo Dr. Rafael Ángel Calderón Guardia (Historical Museum)
 Museo Joaquín García Monge (Historical Museum)
 Museo Histórico Tecnológico Grupo ICE (Historical Technology Museum)
  (La Salle Natural Sciences Museum)
 Museo para la Paz

Alajuela Province
 , Alajuela
 Museo Regional de San Ramón, San Ramón

Cartago Province
 Basilica of Our Lady of the Angels, Cartago

Guanacaste Province
 Museo de Sabanero, Liberia

Heredia Province
 Museo de Cultura Popular (Popular Culture, or Folklore, Museum), Barva
 Museo de Culturas Indígenas Dra. María Eugenia Bozzoli, named in honor of Maria Eugenia Bozzoli, Puerto Viejo, Sarapiquí

See also 

 List of museums
 Culture of Costa Rica
 Tourism in Costa Rica

References

Museums

Museums
Costa Rica
Costa Rica
Museums